Charles Darwin Cooper (August 11, 1926 – November 29, 2013) was an American actor who played a wide variety of television and film roles  from 1950 to 2001.  On Broadway, Cooper appeared in The Winner (1954) and All You Need Is One Good Break (1950).

In 1958 he played outlaw Cando in Season 3 Episode 36 of "Gunsmoke" titled "Chester's Hanging." Also in 1958, Cooper played the outlaw Tate Masters in the episode "Twelve Guns" of NBC's Western television series Cimarron City with George Montgomery and John Smith and played Lt. William Rath in "The Deserter" episode of Tales of Wells Fargo. In 1959, he played a gunfighter, Jack Rollins, in the episode "The Visitor" of Lawman, an ABC/Warner Bros. Television Western series.  He was cast as Matt Yordy in the 1961 episode "Honest Abe" of Chuck Connors' The Rifleman.

Cooper made four guest appearances on Perry Mason, including the role of murderer Philip Strague in the 1958 episode, "The Case of the Buried Clock". His final appearance in 1962 was as Ben Willoughby in "The Case of the Poison Pen-Pal".

Cooper is perhaps best remembered for his appearances in Star Trek-related roles. He played the Klingon chancellor K'mpec in Star Trek: The Next Generation episodes "Sins of the Father" and "Reunion" and the Klingon General Korrd in Star Trek V: The Final Frontier.

His other film roles included appearances in the Alfred Hitchcock film The Wrong Man (1956), A Dog's Best Friend (1959), the comedy Valet Girls (1987), and the action film Blind Fury (1989) starring Rutger Hauer.

Filmography

References

External links

Obituary - LA Times

American male television actors
American male film actors
Male actors from San Francisco
Male actors from Los Angeles
20th-century American male actors
1926 births
2013 deaths